Hopewell is an unincorporated community in Atoka County, Oklahoma, United States. It lies at an elevation of 722 feet (220 m).

References

Unincorporated communities in Atoka County, Oklahoma
Unincorporated communities in Oklahoma